ICTS may refer to:

 ICTS International, a Dutch firm of aviation and general security
 Intermediate Capacity Transit System (now Innovia Metro), a metro system
 International Centre for Theoretical Sciences
 International Container Terminal Services, a port management company in the Philippines
 Iranian Center for Translation Studies

See also
ICT (disambiguation)